Dakshi Agrawal, from the IBM Thomas J. Watson Research Center, Yorktown Heights, New York.

Agrawal obtained his B.Tech. degree from Indian Institute of Technology Kanpur in 1993 and two years later received his M.S. from the Washington University as well as Ph.D. in 1999 from the University of Illinois at Urbana–Champaign, all of which were in electrical engineering. From 1999 to 2000 he worked as a visiting assistant professor at UIUC and in 2000, joined the Thomas J. Watson Research Center of IBM, in Hawthorne, New York as a research scientist. Since 2006 he serves as manager of the Network Management Research Group at the Thomas J. Watson Research Center.

He was named Fellow of the Institute of Electrical and Electronics Engineers (IEEE) in 2012. "for contributions to theory, analysis, and design of efficient, secure, and privacy-preserving communication systems'' and in 2017, he became an IBM Fellow.

References

External links
 

20th-century births
Living people
American electrical engineers
IIT Kanpur alumni
McKelvey School of Engineering alumni
Grainger College of Engineering alumni
Fellow Members of the IEEE
IBM Fellows
Year of birth missing (living people)
Place of birth missing (living people)
Washington University in St. Louis alumni
University of Illinois Urbana-Champaign alumni